Darren Steele (born 13 April 1966) is a former Australian rules footballer who played with North Melbourne and Geelong in the Australian Football League (AFL).

Steele spent nine seasons playing VFL football at North Melbourne, after arriving at the club from Wangaratta. He was a defender and utility, also used as a tagger. At the end of the 1992 season, he was traded to Geelong, along with Leigh Tudor and Liam Pickering.

References

1966 births
Australian rules footballers from Victoria (Australia)
North Melbourne Football Club players
Geelong Football Club players
Wangaratta Football Club players
Living people